
Gmina Mosina is an urban-rural gmina (administrative district) in Poznań County, Greater Poland Voivodeship, in west-central Poland.

Villages
Apart from the town of Mosina, Gmina Mosina contains the villages and settlements of Babki, Baranówko, Baranowo, Bogulin, Bolesławiec, Borkowice, Czapury, Daszewice, Drużyna, Głuszyna Leśna, Jeziory, Konstantynowo, Krajkowo, Krosinko, Krosno, Kubalin, Ludwikowo, Mieczewo, Nowe Dymaczewo, Nowinki, Pecna, Radzewice, Rogalin, Rogalinek, Sasinowo, Sowiniec, Sowinki, Stare Dymaczewo, Świątniki, Wiórek and Żabinko.

Neighbouring gminas
Gmina Mosina is bordered by the towns of Luboń, Poznań and Puszczykowo, and by the gminas of Brodnica, Czempiń, Komorniki, Kórnik and Stęszew.

References
Polish official population figures 2006

Mosina
Poznań County